Szegedi Vízilabda Egyesület is a water polo club from Szeged, Hungary. The team competes in the Országos Bajnokság I.

Naming history
 Szegedi EOL AK: (... – 1984/85)
 Szegedi EOL-DÉLÉP SE: (1985/86) - Merged with DÉLÉP SC
 Szeged SC: (1986/87 – 1992/93)
 Szegedi VE: (1993/94 – 1995/96)
 Heliomed-Szegedi VE:  (1996/97)
 Tabán Trafik-Szegedi VE (1997/98 – 2002/03)
 Szeged-Beton VE: (2002/03 – 2010/11)
 A-Híd Szeged Beton: (2011/12)
 A-Híd Szeged: (2012/13)
 Diapolo Szeged: (2013/14)
 Tiszavirág Szeged Diapolo: (2014/15)
 ContiTech-Szeged Diapolo: (2015/16 – 2016/17)
 ContiTech-Szeged: (2017/18)
 Szegedi VE: (2018/19 – ... )

Honours

Domestic competitions 
Országos Bajnokság I (National Championship of Hungary)
 Third place (7): 1989–90*, 2004–05, 2009–10, 2010–11, 2011–12, 2012–13, 2013–14

Magyar Kupa (National Cup of Hungary)
 Winners (3): 2011, 2012, 2013
 Finalist (2): 1980, 2000–01

European competitions 
LEN Champions League
Quarter-finalist (2): 2011–12, 2012–13

LEN Euro Cup
Winners (1): 2008–09

Current squad
Season 2020–2021

Staff

Transfers 

 In:
 Sándor Illés (from Bp. Honvéd)
 Ivan Basara (from Pécsi VSK)
 Miloš Vukićević (from Partizan)

 Out:
 Aljoša Kunac (to POŠK Split)
 Zsolt Varga (to Kaposvár)
 Lukáš Seman (to OSC)

Recent seasons

 Cancelled due to the COVID-19 pandemic in Hungary.

In European competition
Participations in Champions League (Euroleague): 4x
Participations in Euro Cup (LEN Cup): 9x

Notable former players

Olympic champions
Rajmund Fodor (1986–1996) - 8 year  2000 Sydney, 2004 Athens
Tamás Molnár ( –1998, 2009–2014) - 12 year  2000 Sydney, 2004 Athens, 2008 Beijing
Barnabás Steinmetz (1995–96) - 1 year  2000 Sydney, 2004 Athens
Norbert Hosnyánszky (2005–2006) - 1 year  2008 Beijing
Tamás Varga (2007–2009) - 2 year  2004 Athens, 2008 Beijing

References

External links
 

Water polo clubs in Hungary
Sport in Szeged